The Viewliner is a single-level railroad car type operated by Amtrak on most long-distance routes operating east of Chicago. The first production cars, consisting of an order of 50 sleeping cars, entered service in 1994. From 2015-2016, 70 Viewliner II baggage cars entered service. The new baggage cars are used on all Amtrak trains with full baggage cars, both single-level and bi-level, and replaced all of the Heritage Fleet baggage cars that Amtrak inherited from the freight railroads when it was established in 1971. From 2016-2019, 25 Viewliner II dining cars entered service, which replaced all of the Heritage Fleet dining cars. In 2019, 10 Viewliner II baggage-dormitory cars entered service. The last cars to enter service were 25 Viewliner II sleeping cars in 2021.

Early design

In the 1980s, Amtrak was looking to replace its Heritage Fleet railcars, which had been in service as far back as the 1940s. While new Superliner cars were built starting in 1979, those cars were too tall to run on Amtrak's eastern routes because of clearance issues in and around both New York Pennsylvania Station and Baltimore Pennsylvania Station.

Working with the Budd Company, Amtrak drafted plans for new single-level sleeping and dining cars that utilized a modular design where the interiors of the cars, especially the sleepers, were built in units separate from the exterior shell. These units contain all fixtures, electrical components, sewage and fresh water handling internally and are then mated with the car exterior shell upon assembly. This approach allows for easier maintenance and reconfiguration through removal and replacement of individual units. Access for this purpose is via a removable hatch on the side of the car, a distinguishing feature of the Viewliner series. Unlike the Superliners, occupants of both bunks in the bedrooms have an outside view. The design of the cars was created by Amtrak's design group, which received input from every department in the company. At the time of their introduction into service, Amtrak planned to assemble a fleet of over a thousand cars during the ten years after their introduction.

The prototype Viewliner cars were assembled at Amtrak's Beech Grove Shops in Beech Grove, Indiana, in 1987-1988 from Budd components. Two sleeping cars (2300 and 2301) were built, as was one dining car (8400). These cars were tested on the Capitol Limited beginning in 1988. They were also tested on other trains, such as the Night Owl and the Auto Train. The prototypes were in regular service until 2002.

The prototype Viewliner dining car, car number 8400, was rebuilt with stimulus funding and restored to revenue service in October 2011 and given the name Indianapolis. Originally a prototype dining car with experimental trucks built during the Viewliner design phase in the late 1980s, the car was completely rebuilt at Amtrak's Beech Grove Shops and currently serves on Eastern long distance trains. Information learned from building and using this car was applied to the dining cars included in the new order of Viewliner II cars.

In March 2014, prototype sleeper 2301 (which had been renumbered to 62091) was converted into an inspection car named "American View" and given the number 10004. This inspection car has rear-facing seats and a large glass window at the end that allows passengers to observe the tracks. "American View" is used by maintenance crews to visually inspect the tracks for defects and by the Amtrak president and other executives for official purposes.

Production

Viewliner I
The first production Viewliners were built in 19951996 by Amerail (now Alstom)/Morrison-Knudsen. Amtrak's original intention in the 1980s was to order 500600 new cars, of which 100 would be sleepers and the rest coaches, diners, and lounges. This would have enabled Amtrak to replace its remaining Heritage Fleet equipment and run trains with solid Viewliner consists. Ultimately, Amtrak awarded a contract for 50 sleeping cars with an option for 227 cars of various types to Morrison-Knudsen, who were also building the new California Cars based on the Superliner design. Morrison-Knudsen unveiled the first Viewliner shell at its Chicago plant on October 26, 1994. The first entered service on the Lake Shore Limited in November 1995.

After Morrison-Knudsen was placed in bankruptcy, the outstanding orders were completed by Amerail with final delivery in 1996 alongside the California Car fleet. After the first 50 cars were delivered, none of the remaining 177 options were exercised. The 50 Viewliners arrived just in time to retire most of Amtrak's remaining Heritage sleeping cars, which were coming under increasing environmental pressure due to their use of non-retention toilets. Since the 1990s, Viewliner sleepers have operated on East Coast single-level trains in concert with Amfleet coaches and Heritage diners (and eventually Viewliner diners).

When Amtrak decided on the names for the new Viewliner II sleeping cars, they also announced new names for the Viewliner I sleepers. Instead of names ending in "View," e.g. American View; Mountain View, they were given names to match the incoming cars: alphabetically after major rivers east of the Mississippi.

Viewliner II

On July 23, 2010, Amtrak ordered 130 Viewliner II cars55 baggage cars, 25 dining cars, 25 sleepers, and 25 baggage-dormswith an option for up to 70 additional cars. The five-year order, worth $298.1 million, was placed with CAF USA in Elmira, New York, a fully owned subsidiary of Construcciones y Auxiliar de Ferrocarriles. According to former Amtrak president Joseph Boardman, CAF was selected over Alstom, the only other bidder, due to CAF's lower bid and it being able to construct the entire car at its factory, rather than relying on subcontractors. In August 2014, the order was modified by swapping 15 baggage-dorms for 15 baggage cars, changing their totals to 10 and 70, respectively.

The first car from the order was originally scheduled to roll off the assembly line in October 2012, but was delayed by more than a year, with field testing beginning in June 2014. CAF had multiple issues, including failure to detect defects in the baggage cars, and quality issues with initial construction of the diner and sleeping cars. Amtrak also experienced project management challenges in addressing these faults. While all 130 cars were originally expected to be delivered by the end of 2015, by December 2016 only the baggage cars and one diner were in service. The final cars were delivered in August 2021.

Viewliner IIs have an updated version of Amtrak's older Phase III paint scheme. The baggage cars are numbered 61000–61069 and the bag-dorms are numbered 69000–69009. The dining cars, numbered 68000–68024, are named alphabetically after the first 25 state capitals east of the Mississippi River, with Indianapolis being the name of the Viewliner I which was rebuilt as a prototype. The sleeping cars (62500–62524) are alphabetically named after major rivers east of the Mississippi, continued from the renaming of the Viewliner I sleepers.  Unlike the roomettes on Viewliner I sleepers, the Viewliner II roomettes do not have in-room toilets; instead, there are two shared restrooms. Because of this, the Viewliner II sleepers have one fewer roomette than the Viewliner I sleepers11 versus 12.

Future cars 
In 2022, Amtrak announced that they would be replacing all of their current Superliner, Amfleet II, and Viewliner I passenger cars used for long-distance service by 2032. Amtrak issued a request for information from ten manufacturers in December 2022. Request for proposals are planned for 2023.

Service
Viewliner passenger cars are designed for use on Amtrak's long-distance routes in the Eastern United States: the Cardinal, Crescent, Lake Shore Limited, and the Silver Services, due to clearance issues in and around New York Pennsylvania Station and Baltimore Pennsylvania Station that prevent tall bi-level cars from clearing the tunnels.

Viewliner baggage cars are used on all Superliner and single-level trains which use full baggage cars on the Amtrak system. The first Viewliner baggage cars entered service on March 23, 2015 on multiple Eastern routes, with the last entering service in December 2016.

Notes

References

Further reading

External links

Viewliner 3D Tour

Amtrak rolling stock
Rail passenger cars of the United States
Train-related introductions in 1995